Chicago Statement may refer to: 
 Chicago principles: freedom of expression on college campuses in the United States
or some late twentieth century Protestant theological considerations: 
 Chicago Statement on Biblical Inerrancy
 Chicago Statement on Biblical Hermeneutics
 Chicago Statement on Biblical Application